Yolanda Ncokotwana is a South African TV presenter and producer. She is a co-writer on FILM SHOWREEL: The 24 Hour Project, along with Reineth Mokoena on Metro FM, South Africa. She is the Manager of Production and Development at the National Film and Video Foundation (NFVF) of South Africa.

Career
In July 2020, she was part of the Mehret Mandefro-led Indaba Africa inaugural group of participants from across the African continent with career development focus, participating in online workshops between August 28 and September 11, 2020 with the chief aim of creating new ways of financing the changing African cinema by helping producers in terms of building finance bases for co-production from the scratch.

References

External links
 Yolanda Ncokotwana on Encounters
 Yolanda Ncokotwana on EAVE
 Yolanda Ncokotwana on FilmContact
 Yolanda Ncokotwana on Dryfta
 Yolanda Olwethu Ncokotwana on LinkedIn
 Tübingen South Africa Program 2010, Report: "Music" by Yolanda Ncokotwana

Living people
South African television presenters
South African women television presenters
Year of birth missing (living people)